Pyrausta unipunctata is a moth in the family Crambidae. It was described by Arthur Gardiner Butler in 1881. It is found in Japan.

References

Moths described in 1881
unipunctata
Moths of Japan